The Italian ambassador to OSCE is the ambassador of the Italian Government to the Organisation for the Cooperation and Security in Europe in Vienna.

List of representatives

See also
List of diplomatic missions of Italy
List of ambassadors of Italy

References 

Lists of ambassadors of Italy
Organization for Security and Co-operation in Europe